VoxelStorm Ltd is a British independent game development studio, video game publisher and music publisher. The company was founded by Eugene Hopkinson, and is based in England and Scotland.

VoxelStorm writes their game engines in-house, allowing them to have full control over what they are producing.

Themes
VoxelStorm's games tend to focus on Retrofuturism and cyberpunk themes, with dark cynical humour.  The settings of their games are frequently procedurally generated.  The graphics in VoxelStorm games tend to be heavily stylized rather than realistic.

Distribution
VoxelStorm makes their games available on Windows, Linux and OS X.

Game jams
VoxelStorm has taken part in multiple Game jams. AdvertCity, a published VoxelStorm game, was originally started in a CyberPunk Game Jam. GolfXTRM was made in the Fuck This Jam Game Jam.

Music
VoxelStorm has been described as placing a great deal of emphasis on creating rich original soundtracks for their games.  The AdvertCity Soundtrack has received critical praise for its unusual genre choices for video game music, variously described as "cyber-jazz" and "postrock, jazz & glitch".  It has been called "A profound and stunning accomplishment, even as a standalone soundtrack."

Games 

 GolfXTRM
 Fractyr
 AdvertCity (April 2015)
 sphereFACE (May 2017)

References

External links
 VoxelStorm official website

Indie video game developers
Video game companies of the United Kingdom
Video game development companies
Companies based in Rochdale Borough
Soundtrack record labels
British independent record labels
Record labels established in 2012
Music publishing companies of the United Kingdom
Privately held companies of England
Privately held companies of the United Kingdom
British companies established in 2012